The following is a list of the exports of Albania.

Data is for 2012, in millions of United States dollars, as reported by The Observatory of Economic Complexity. The top ten exports are listed.

References

Exports
Albania